OUSD is an acronym used to refer to the following school districts:

Oakland Unified School District
Ontario Unified School District
Ojai Unified School District
Orange Unified School District